Gilmar Luís Rinaldi (born 13 January 1959), is a Brazilian former footballer who played as a goalkeeper, and a current football agent of such players as Adriano.

Gilmar competed for Brazil at the 1984 Summer Olympics, and was part of the victorious 1994 FIFA World Cup squad.

After retiring as a player, Gilmar returned to Flamengo in 1999 as Superintendent of Football. He held this position for two consecutive years and then went on to devote himself to the role of sports agent for football players.

After the 2014 World Cup, Gilmar was announced as General Coordinator for the Seleção.

Career statistics

Club

International

Honours

Club 
Internacional
 Rio Grande do Sul State Championship: 1981, 1982, 1983, 1984

São Paulo
 São Paulo State Championship: 1985, 1987, 1989
 Brazilian National Championship: 1986

Flamengo
 Rio State Championship: 1991
 Brazilian National Championship: 1992

International 
Brazil
 FIFA World Cup: 1994

Individual 
 Brazilian "Silver ball" (Placar): 1986, 1989

References

External links

1959 births
1994 FIFA World Cup players
Brazil international footballers
Brazilian football agents
Brazilian footballers
Brazilian expatriate footballers
Campeonato Brasileiro Série A players
Cerezo Osaka players
CR Flamengo footballers
J1 League players
Expatriate footballers in Japan
FIFA World Cup-winning players
Association football goalkeepers
Footballers at the 1984 Summer Olympics
Living people
Olympic footballers of Brazil
Olympic silver medalists for Brazil
Sport Club Internacional players
São Paulo FC players
Olympic medalists in football
Medalists at the 1984 Summer Olympics
People from Erechim
Sportspeople from Rio Grande do Sul
20th-century Brazilian people